The Men's 50 metre freestyle competition of the 2020 European Aquatics Championships was held on 22 and 23 May 2021.

Records
Prior to the competition, the existing world and championship records were as follows.

Results

Heats
The heats were started on 22 May at 10:15.

Swim-off
The swim-off was held on 22 May at 11:50.

Semifinals
The semifinals were held on 22 May at 18:34.

Semifinal 1

Semifinal 2

Final
The final was held on 23 May at 18:05.

References

External links

Men's 50 metre freestyle